Séchin is a commune in the Doubs department in the Bourgogne-Franche-Comté region in eastern France.

Geography

History
The village was burned in 1944 in reprisal for an attack on a German convoy. It was rebuilt in the early 1950s.

Population

See also
 Communes of the Doubs department

References

External links

 Séchin on the regional Web site 

Communes of Doubs